was a Shinto shrine located in Hualien City, Hualien County (formerly Karenkō city, Karenkō prefecture) in Taiwan during Japanese colonial rule. It was ranked as a Prefectural Shrine (県社 kensha) and was the central shrine in Karenkō Prefecture.

History
The shrine was built on August 19, 1915 (Taishō 4). Prince Yoshihisa and the Three Kami Deities of Cultivation (開拓三神 kaitaku sannin) (Ōkunitama no Mikoto (大国魂命), Ōnamuchi no Mikoto (大己貴命), Sukunahikona no Mikoto (少彦名命)) were enshrined. On March 2, 1921 (Taishō 10) the shrine was classified as a Prefectural Shrine.

After World War II, the shrine became a martyrs' shrine honoring Taiwan's heroes such as Tei Seikō (Koxinga), Liu Yongfu, and Qiu Fengjia (邱逢甲). In 1981, the shrine was demolished to make way for the Hualien Martyrs' Shrine which was built in the Northern Palace Architecture style.

See also
List of Shinto shrines in Taiwan

External links
Hualien Official Tourist Website Photos of the Hualien Martyr's Shrine which replaced the Karenkō Shrine

Demolished buildings and structures in Taiwan
Buildings and structures demolished in 1981